Higher Ninnes and Lower Ninnes are hamlets, south of Mulfra Hill in the civil parish of Madron in west Cornwall, England, UK.

Toponymy
Recorded as Insula (in 1314), Enes (1327'), Enys (1403), Nenis (1623). An enys is isolated land or an island. Wartha (higher) was recorded in 1403.

History
Higher Ninnes was sold by auction in 1880 by Elizabeth Nicholls.

References

Hamlets in Cornwall